This is a list of Ghanaian films released in 2018.

References

2018
Ghana